Hotell Gyllene knorren ("Hotel Golden Pigtail") was the Sveriges Television's Christmas calendar in 2010.

Plot 
The Rantanen family leaves town for the countryside, where they purchase a hotel from the Grossman family, named "Hotell Gyllene Orren" (Hotel Golden Black Grouse). The family consists of; dad Roger Rantanen, who used to work as a vacuum cleaner salesman; mum Ritva Rantanen from Finland, who used to work on a ferry; sister Isadora Rantanen, 14 years old and in love with the hotel competitor family's son; and Ingo Rantanen, is a big friend of animals and finds out there is a pig on the hotel, named Pyret.

The Rantanens are struggling to keep the hotel running as a new more modern hotel, opened by the Grossman family, has started up nearby the highway.
Many guests checked out after Ingo, one of the family members, accidentley told there was a pig on the hotel. A journalist arrived at the hotel and checked in, and was shortly after checked out after finding out there's barely no food, very old style and about the pig. She therefore stopped by the hotel sign on the alley leading to the hotel, adding "KN" before "orren", which turns out as "knorren" ("pigtail"). Many other planned guests therefore decided not to check in at the hotel. The Rantanens try their best to receive guests.

Cast 
 Maria Sid – Ritva Rantanen; mother of the Rantanen family
 Peter Engman – Roger Rantanen; father of the Rantanen family
 Linnea Firsching – Isadora Rantanen; daughter of the Rantanen family
 Buster Isitt – Ingo Rantanen; son of the Rantanen family
 Axel Karlsson – Tony Grossman; son of the Grossman family
 Simon Norrthon – Henning Grossman; father of the Grossman family
 Karin Bergquist – Amelia Grossman; mother of the Grossman family
 Vanna Rosenberg – reporter Wallraff; the journalist who scribbled on the hotel sign
 Annika Augustsson – editor in chief Charlotta
 Jane Friedmann – Laila
 Jesper Bromark – Ritva's chief
 Stefan Klockby – Rasmus van Damme
 Johan Rheborg – Lennart; vacuum cleaner competitor seller and friend of Roger Rantanen
 Johannes Wanselow – neighbour and farmer Jönsson; the owner of the pig Pyret
 Carla Abrahamsen – Angelika Grossman; cousin to Tony Grossman
 Shima Niavarani – Yvonne
 Kajsa Ernst – Inga-Kajsa
 Sunil Munshi – Kennert
 Kåre Möder – carbon man
 Filippa Höglund – Hanna
 Ameria Yakan – Carro
 Olof Wretling – Rolf
 Sven Björklund – Rudolf
 Per Svensson – Jesper Jeppson; father of the Jeppson family, guests at the hotel
 Ann-Charlotte Franzén – Jenny Jeppson; mother of the Jeppson family, guests at the hotel
 Linda Camarena – Janina Jeppson; daughter of the Jeppson family, guests at the hotel
 Violetta Stephan-Barsotti – Annika Bonusson
 Josef Törner – parking inspector
 Michael Bergqvist och Sandra Camenisch – lovers
 Lotta Tejle – councillor Marianne
 David Wiberg – assistant Razak

Video 
The series was released to VHS and DVD on 26 January 2011..

References

External links 
 
 

2010 Swedish television series debuts
2010 Swedish television series endings
Gyllene knorren
Sveriges Television's Christmas calendar